A dropkick is an attacking maneuver in professional wrestling. It is defined as an attack where the wrestler jumps up and kicks the opponent with the soles of both feet; this sees the wrestler twist as they jump so that when the feet connect with the opponent one foot is raised higher than the other (depending on which way they twist) and the wrestler falls back to the mat on their side, or front. This is commonly employed by light and nimble wrestlers who can take advantage of their agility, and is often executed on a charging opponent, while charging at an opponent, or a combination of the two.

The most basic form of a dropkick, but potentially the hardest to pull off, is a standing dropkick first used by "Jumping Joe" Savoldi where the wrestler catches a standing or running opponent with a standard dropkick from a standing position. In order to be pulled off effectively, it requires great leg strength in order to gain elevation. Savoldi, a former All-American running back for Knute Rockne at Notre Dame, used his association with football to identify the move as the "drop-kick" and the press also called it a "flying dropkick".

The dropkick in its current form was thought to perhaps originated by "Jumping Joe" Savoldi, although wrestler Abe Coleman, known as "Hebrew Hercules" and "Jewish Cougars", can also be seen in early video using a feet-first dive at an opponent's waist. Coleman, listed at 5'2" in height, called the move a "Kangaroo Kick" and claimed the move was inspired by kangaroos he saw on a tour of Australia in 1930. When Savoldi performed the "drop" kick in 1933, the press simply said it was another name for Coleman's existing "kangaroo" kick specialty.

Variations

Baseball slide
The wrestler runs and slides feet first at the opponent, kicking them with both feet, like a baseball player sliding into a base. It is usually performed by a wrestler in the ring sliding to kick the upper torso or head of a wrestler standing outside and beside the ring. A variation involves sliding to kick the head of an opponent hung upside-down from the turnbuckles.

In defensive terms, a baseball slide can be used to counter an Irish whip, as the whipped wrestler slides before they hit the ropes. It can also be used to slide under an opponent, usually as a technique to avoid an attempted kick.

Corner dropkick 
The wrestler sets up the opponent, usually seated at a corner turnbuckle and hits him with a dropkick. The most common variation of this is a rope-aided version, where the wrestler uses the ring ropes to elevate his body, connecting with a dropkick to the opponent's chest upon landing. Used by Jeff Hardy and Jack Gallagher.

Dropsault 
Also known as a backflip dropkick, a dropsault is an attack where the wrestler jumps up and kicks the opponent with both feet and then executes a backflip, landing on the mat chest-first. Sometimes this move can see the wrestler land chest-first on another opponent. Many wrestlers perform this move with great care, as any slight twist in their body can injure them. This move was popularized by Paul London during his tenure in the WWE.

Front dropkick 
Popularized by Jumping Joe Savoldi and Abe Coleman, the front dropkick involves the wrestler jumping kicking forward so that they hit the opponent with the soles of both feet. This enables the wrestler to fall backwards to the mat, landing on their upper back and shoulder area. This is often used to attack lower parts of the opponent than the modern dropkick.

Another variation, known as a shotgun dropkick, sees the wrestler charge from one corner to an opponent standing in the middle of the ring and dropkicking them with such force that it catapults the opponent into the corner. This was popularized in Japan by Takahiro Suwa and Yasushi Kanda before Finn Bálor made it famous in America.

Missile dropkick 

A missile dropkick is involves the wrestler jumping off the second or top turnbuckle and performing the dropkick on a standing opponent.

Corner-to-corner missile dropkick 
In this variant, the attacking wrestler first sets up the opponent such that he is near one corner (or side) of the ring in a seated position, before himself proceeding to the opposite diagonal corner (or side) and ascending to the top or second rope. From this position the wrestler leaps at his opponent and performs a front dropkick. Often a wrestler performing this maneuver will place a chair or other foreign object in front of the opponent's head, wedging the chair between the middle and bottom ropes such that it is relatively steady, and causing it to be driven into the opponent's face or head upon impact. This move was invented by Rob Van Dam as the Van Terminator, and later popularized by Shane McMahon as the Coast to Coast. Sami Zayn uses a somersault version during the independent circuit as El Generico. The move is also damaging to the person performing the move, as Shane McMahon had hit the back of his head after landing the dropkick upon landing due to the force recoil.

Running single leg dropkick 
In this dropkick an attacking wrestler runs towards an opponent and jumps up sideways striking an opponent's head or chin with the sole of their highest foot, with similar execution as a big boot. A front dropkick variation, in which the attacking wrestler does not twist like in a normal dropkick, is also possible. Drew McIntyre uses this as a finisher and calls it the Claymore.

Springboard dropkick
In this variation, the wrestler jumps onto the ring ropes from either the ring apron or from inside the ring, jumps towards their opponent, and extends their legs to hit them in the head or chest with the soles of their feet.

Standing dropkick 

In this variation, the wrestler executes a traditional dropkick, but twists his/her body while performing it in a standing position. There is also a slight variation where the attacker holds on to their opponent by the head with one hand while dropkicking them. This variation was innovated by David Von Erich and popularized by Curt Hennig.

See also 
 Double-team dropkicks
 Professional wrestling attacks
 Professional wrestling aerial techniques

Footnotes

References 
 The Professional Wrestlers' Workout & Instructional Guide - Harley Race, Ricky Steamboat, Les Thatcher, and Alex Marvez pg. 66

Professional wrestling moves
Kicks
de:Liste der Wrestling-Kampftechniken#Kicks